The Research Institute of Organic Agriculture (German: Forschungsinstitut für biologischen Landbau, in short: FiBL), is an organic farming information and research centres. As an independent and non-profit organization, it promotes research and projects that help farmers improve their productivity with consideration of environmental and health impacts.

The Research Institute of Organic Agriculture is located in Frick, Switzerland with branches in Germany and Austria (and projects world-wide). Currently, the Swiss centre employs about 175 people.

History

The Forschungsinstitut für biologischen Landbau (FiBL) was founded in Switzerland in 1973 by a group of organic farmers and scientists who wanted to promote the growth of the organic farming industry. At the time, the organic movement was still in its initial stages. The founders of FiBL wanted to create a foundation that was exclusively developed to disseminating information and practical advice to farmers who wanted to depart from conventional practices.

Notes and references

External links
 

 

Organic farming organizations
Research institutes in Switzerland
Agricultural organisations based in Switzerland